The 2013 FIVB Women's Club World Championship was the 7th edition of the event. It was held in Zurich, Switzerland, from 9 to 13 October 2013. Vakıfbank Istanbul won the title and Jovana Brakočević was named Most Valuable Player.

Qualification

Pools composition

Squads

Venue

Pool standing procedure
Match won 3–0 or 3–1: 3 points for the winner, 0 points for the loser
Match won 3–2: 2 points for the winner, 1 point for the loser
In case of tie, the teams will be classified according to the following criteria:
number of matches won, sets ratio and points ratio

Preliminary round
All times are Central European Summer Time (UTC+2).

Pool A

|}

|}

Pool B

|}

  
|}

Final round
All times are Central European Summer Time (UTC+2).

Bracket

Semifinals

|}

3rd place

|}

Final

|}

Final standing

Awards

Most Valuable Player
 Jovana Brakočević ( Vakıfbank Istanbul)
Best Opposite Spiker
 Sarah Pavan ( Unilever Vôlei) 
Best Outside Hitters
 Kenia Carcaces ( Voléro Zürich)
 Gözde Kırdar Sonsırma ( Vakıfbank Istanbul) 

Best Middle Blockers
 Christiane Fürst ( Vakıfbank Istanbul)
 Carol ( Unilever Vôlei) 
Best Setter
 Shen Jingsi ( Guangdong Evergrande) 
Best Libero
 Yuko Sano ( Voléro Zürich)

References

External links
Official Website of the 2013 FIVB Club World Championship

2013 FIVB Women's Club World Championship
FIVB Women's Club World Championship
FIVB Women's Club World Championship
FIVB Volleyball Women's Club World Championship
Sport in Zürich
21st century in Zürich